Elections to Moray District Council were held on 6 April 1992, the same day as the other Scottish local government elections.

Election results

Ward results

References

1992
1992 Scottish local elections
20th century in Moray